Chloris striate mosaic virus (CSMV) is a plant pathogenic virus of the family Geminiviridae.

External links
ICTVdB - The Universal Virus Database: Chloris striate mosaic virus
Family Groups - The Baltimore Method

Viral plant pathogens and diseases
Geminiviridae